Monoacetylmorphine may refer to:

 3-Monoacetylmorphine, a less active metabolite of heroin
 6-Monoacetylmorphine, an active metabolite of heroin